Fredrik Wikström Nicastro is a Swedish film producer and SVP of international productions at SF Studios.

Career

Fredrik was the producer and co-writer of the award-winning thriller Easy Money in 2010. The film was a huge success in Sweden and internationally. It was presented by Martin Scorsese to the US audience where it has received 85% fresh on Rotten Tomatoes. The film launched two successful and critically acclaimed sequels that Fredrik also produced and co-wrote. A spin off TV-series was also produced for Netflix, on which Fredrik served as Executive Producer.

Fredrik has also produced and served as executive producer/co-producer on films such as the Oscar nominated hit A Man Called Ove, the 2017 opening film of Toronto Filmfestival Borg vs McEnroe, Bamse och Tjuvstaden, Bolgen and Pojken med Guldbyxorna.

Fredrik has announced that he is moving into producing English speaking films and has produced Horizon Line, starring Allison Williams and Alexander Dreymon and announced he is in development of a film adaptation of Vilhelm Moberg's novel The Emigrants, set to be directed by Erik Poppe.

References

Swedish film producers
Living people
Date of birth missing (living people)
Year of birth missing (living people)